Joel Thomas Hynes (born September 29, 1976) is a Canadian writer, actor and director known for his irreverent, oftentimes dark and uproarious characters and a raw, unflinching vision of modern underground Canada.

Career
His 2017 novel We'll All Be Burnt in Our Beds Some Night won the Governor General's Award for English-language fiction and the Winterset Award and was longlisted for the Scotiabank Giller Prize.

He has released two albums - JTH Live at the LSPU Hall and 2018's Dead Man's Melody, a concept album that loosely follows the story of a doomed relationship that ends in murder and mayhem with the album's main character barricaded inside a house, unabashed, determined to go out in a hail of bullets. The album was produced in Toronto by Eamon McGrath.

His debut novel Down to the Dirt won the Percy Janes First Novel Award, was shortlisted for the Atlantic Book Award and the Winterset Award, and was longlisted for the International Dublin Literary Award and the ReLit Award. The novel was subsequently adapted into the film Down to the Dirt, in which Hynes also played the lead role. The unabridged audiobook edition of Down to the Dirt narrated by Johnny Harris, Joel Thomas Hynes and Sherry White was recorded by Rattling Books in 2006. Down to the Dirt has been translated into numerous languages and adapted to stage.

The follow up to Down to the Dirt was the gritty novel Right Away Monday, also available with HarperCollins Publishers.

Hynes is the creator, an executive producer and plays the lead role in the hit CBC comedy series Little Dog, which follows burned out boxer Tommy "Little Dog" Ross on the rocky road to redemption after he makes a reluctant return to the ring after a long, shameful hiatus.

Hynes has performed numerous lead and leading roles for television, film, and theatre. His credits include the television series Hatching, Matching and Dispatching (for which he was also a writer), as well as the films Rabbittown, Crackie, The Con Artist, Messiah from Montreal, The Sparky Book, Ashore , Hunting Pignut, A Christmas Fury, and many others.

Hynes's gothic novella Say Nothing Saw Wood, inspired by a true story of a grisly murder that happened in his hometown in 1971, was adapted to the big screen under the title Cast No Shadow, and went on to receive numerous accolades on the festival circuit. Hynes was awarded the Michael Weir Award for best Atlantic Screenwriter at the Atlantic Film Festival and was nominated for a Canadian Screen Award for Best Adapted Screenplay. In Cast No Shadow, Hynes plays opposite his real life son Percy Hynes White. White won numerous accolades for his portrayal of Cast No Shadow'''s young, disturbed protagonist Jude Traynor, including the Rising Star Award at the Edmonton International Film Festival and the Best Actor Award at the Atlantic Film Festival.

Hynes was named Artist of the Year by the Newfoundland and Labrador Arts Council in 2008, has received the Lawrence Jackson Writer's Award, the Summerwork's Theatre Festival's Contra Guys Award, and also in 2008 won the Cuffer Prize. He has also played recurring characters on Republic of Doyle, Orphan Black, Mary Kills People, and Frontier.

Hynes currently divides his time between Newfoundland, Toronto, and California. He is the nephew of singer-songwriter Ron Hynes.

Works

NovelsDown to the Dirt (2005)Right Away Monday (2007)Say Nothing Saw Wood (2013)We'll All Be Burnt in Our Beds Some Night (2017) (winner of the 2017 Governor General's Award for English-language fiction, longlisted for the 2017 Scotiabank Giller Prize)

AudiobooksDown to the Dirt (2006)

PlaysThe Devil You Don't Know (co-written with Sherry White) (2011)Say Nothing Saw Wood (2009)Broken Accidents (2010)Incinerator Road (2011)

ChapbookGod Help Thee: A Manifesto (2011)

PoetryStraight Razor Days (2012)

Filmography

FilmsMessiah from Montreal (2001)Ashore (2002)The Bread Maker (2003)Down to the Dirt (2008)Crackie (2009)Grown Up Movie Star (2009)The Con Artist (2010)Cast No Shadow (2014)Relative Happiness (2015)First Round DownHunting Pignut (2016)Goalie (2019)Wildhood (2021)A Small Fortune (2021)

TVHatching, Matching and Dispatching (2005)Rabbittown (2006)ReGenesis (2008, one episode)Republic of Doyle (2013)The Book of Negroes (2015)Orphan Black (2016)Frontier (2016 TV series) (2017)Little Dog (2018)Trickster (2020)Hudson and Rex'' (2021)

References

External links

1976 births
Living people
20th-century Canadian dramatists and playwrights
20th-century Canadian male actors
20th-century Canadian male writers
20th-century Canadian novelists
20th-century Canadian screenwriters
21st-century Canadian dramatists and playwrights
21st-century Canadian male actors
21st-century Canadian male writers
21st-century Canadian novelists
21st-century Canadian screenwriters
Chapbook writers
Canadian Film Centre alumni
Canadian male dramatists and playwrights
Canadian male film actors
Canadian male novelists
Canadian male screenwriters
Canadian male stage actors
Canadian male television actors
Canadian male television writers
Canadian television writers
Governor General's Award-winning fiction writers
Male actors from Newfoundland and Labrador
People from Newfoundland (island)
Writers from Newfoundland and Labrador
Film producers from Newfoundland and Labrador